Ants from Up There is the second studio album by British rock band Black Country, New Road, released on 4 February 2022 on Ninja Tune. Recorded at Chale Abbey on the Isle of Wight, the album was produced by the band's live sound engineer Sergio Maschetzko, and is the final album to feature lead vocalist and guitarist Isaac Wood, who announced his departure from the band on 31 January 2022, four days prior to the album's release.

Written during COVID-19 lockdowns and road-tested during brief touring stints in support of their debut album, For the First Time (2021), the album was released almost exactly a year after their debut, and was preceded by four singles: "Chaos Space Marine", "Bread Song", "Concorde" and "Snow Globes".

The album received unanimous critical acclaim upon its release. It became Black Country, New Road's highest-charting album, debuting at No. 3 on the UK Albums Chart and also reaching the top ten in Australia, Germany and the Netherlands.

Background and recording
Ants from Up There is Black Country, New Road's second album, following their 2021 debut For the First Time. Speaking to NME at the 2021 Mercury Prize awards ceremony, for which their debut album had been nominated, the band confirmed that they had already completed work on a follow-up, describing the album as "sad, epic, and possibly more universally likeable" and that the songs are "more palatable" compared to For the First Time. Bassist Tyler Hyde stated that "we have figured out what we're trying to say, so it makes a bit more sense. Some of the songs are shorter. We attempted to write songs that were three and a half minutes."

Writing for the album began in winter 2020, when the United Kingdom announced a new lockdown to combat deaths from the COVID-19 pandemic. Hyde and Wayne expressed disgust with Prime Minister Boris Johnson's actions during the lockdown. The band embarked on a socially distant summer tour in June 2021 to road test their new material. Wayne claimed in an interview with Uncut, "That tour had quite a specific purpose. It wasn't necessarily just to be present out there on the road, it was to workshop these songs and see how they fared in front of people; to make sure we hadn't got it wrong."

The album was recorded over two weeks at Chale Abbey Studios, on the Isle of Wight, in the summer of 2021. The band's live sound engineer, Sergio Maschetzko, produced the sessions. Hyde told Uncut, "He'd never actually recorded an album before. The intention was to capture what we were doing live as closely as possible and he was the man for the job because he knows us better than anyone else - he sometimes knows our playing better than we do." As a result, the band recorded the majority of the album live in the studio. The album was recorded in the late summer of 2021. In an interview with Uncut, Wayne said, "It's funny, because the day we started recording was the day that everyone opened up in the UK. We were in a farmhouse for two weeks without access to a car, so in a way it was a continuation of our isolation. But I suppose that's how the album was written, so maybe it's faithful [to the material] – that's how it was recorded as well."

Wood, the lead vocalist, announced his departure from the band on 31 January 2022 due to mental health reasons, four days before the album's release date. The band's first United States tour was cancelled as a result. The remaining members said they will not continue to perform music written with Wood after his departure.

Composition and lyrics 
Musically, Ants from Up There primarily incorporates post-rock, chamber pop and art rock. It has been compared to Canadian indie rock bands Arcade Fire and Wolf Parade, with the band noting that they were directly influenced by Arcade Fire's Funeral (2004), Sufjan Stevens' Illinois (2005), Arthur Russell's Iowa Dream (2019) and Billie Eilish's Happier Than Ever (2021) during the recording process. Hyde and drummer Charlie Wayne stated that the album took some structural influence from pop music, describing its makeup as "more conceptually pop than sounding like pop". Whereas For the First Time was a collection of songs that the band had already been playing live, Ants from Up There was the first album where the band specifically sought to make every song fit with the others as "one body of work", according to saxophonist Lewis Evans.

Many of the album's tracks stem from initial writing sessions between band members Issac Wood (vocals, guitar), Tyler Hyde (bass) and Luke Mark (guitar), who lived together during the first COVID-19 lockdown. Drummer Charlie Wayne noted: "The first time I heard ideas for "Concorde" or "The Place Where He Inserted the Blade" was when I came over to hang out in their kitchen and we got this little drum kit set up." In January 2021, the month before the release of the band's debut studio album, For the First Time, the full band convened for a week to work on new material: "Eventually there was a week-long rehearsal session in Hoxton in January where we all came together, and that's when the songs really became whole. It's only when everyone has brought their own constituent parts to it that you can really credit it as Black Country, New Road."

"Basketball Shoes", which dates back prior to the release of For the First Time, was the first song written for the album, followed by "Snow Globes". Hyde stated that "other than that, most of them were written at the same time and they were all essentially birthed by 'Basketball Shoes'". In comparison to For the First Time, which was emotionally apathetic and dealt with fictional scenarios, Hyde and Wayne said Ants from Up There features more vulnerable lyrical topics.

"Intro" contains an instrumental motif found in "Basketball Shoes", the album's closer. It incorporates klezmer elements, a style of Jewish music which Evans and multi-instrumentalist Georgia Ellery had experience playing. Lead single "Chaos Space Marine" came "about through a joke", Hyde said. The song derived its name from the eponymous miniature figurines in the Warhammer 40,000 franchise. Third single "Concorde" was inspired by science fiction stories including Luca and 2012.

"Haldern" was named after the Haldern Pop music festival in Germany, which the band played during the pandemic. It is the only song on the album to originate from an improvisation session. "Mark's Theme" is an instrumental written by Evans following the passing of his uncle Mark from COVID-19 in 2021. "Snow Globes" was performed as early as January 2020, a notable example being a 2020 Christmas livestream concert with Black Midi, with the band adding new elements to each successive live performance similar to rapper Kanye West's alterations to previously recorded studio material; the band also took inspiration from Frank Ocean's song "White Ferrari".

Hyde described closing song "Basketball Shoes" as "essentially a medley of the whole album", containing motifs repeated from the album's earlier songs such as "Concorde" and the clamp from "Snow Globes". Wayne said that it was "three songs in one, basically". It was one of the first songs the band wrote and predates For the First Time, originally describing an unhealthy obsession with British singer Charli XCX in its earliest form before undergoing significant lyrical changes for the final version.

Wayne and Hyde named "Snow Globes" and "The Place Where He Inserted The Blade" the easiest and hardest tracks to record respectively. The former ended up on the album in the form of its first take in studio, while the recording process of the latter took considerable time due to a technical error on Wayne's part.

The album's title was its last component to be finalized, with the band naming it on the day of its deadline. It refers to the appearance of people while viewed from an airplane, tying in with the album cover and the recurring lyrical theme of the Concorde jet. The artwork for the album's promotional materials came from band members' childhood drawings.

Promotion and release 
Ants from Up There was announced on 12 October 2021 alongside the release of the album's first single, "Chaos Space Marine", which Wood described as "the best song [they have] ever written". On 2 November 2021, the band released "Bread Song" as the second single. The song's style and instrumentation were inspired by Steve Reichs Music for 18 Musicians, wherein the band were to play without definitive timing and cues. A third song, "Concorde", was released on 30 November 2021 as the album's third single. In an interview with Consequence, the band said that they used the mandolin to give the song "unpredictability" and "a snappy and spiky element".

The band released "Snow Globes", the fourth and final single, on 19 January 2022. In a statement, Wayne noted the contrast between the drum track and the rest of the instruments, serving in a more independent and expressive role.  The track had previously been performed in an earlier state as part of the group's joint fundraiser for the Windmill with Black Midi on 10 December 2020.

Critical reception

Ants from Up There received universal acclaim from music critics. At Metacritic, the album has received an average score of 92, based on 20 reviews. The album has been widely touted as a 'masterpiece,' receiving many perfect scores from critics upon release. According to Metacritic, it was the third-most critically acclaimed album of 2022.

NME gave the album five stars out of five, proclaiming that the band managed "to pivot towards more familiar, accessible sounds and embrace traditional song structures – without sacrificing an ounce of their musical wizardry or inventiveness", declaring it "truly remarkable" and a "future cult classic" in the wake of Wood's departure. The Independent, in a five stars out of five review, declared that "the sheer grace and ambition of Ants... will prove tough for 2022 to top", citing the "grunge rock crescendos accompanying images of burning starships on 'Good Will Hunting', and gargantuan arias on the 12-minute 'Basketball Shoes'" as track highlights. Ian Cohen of Pitchfork praised the album's "life-affirming," emo-like sentimentality in a review awarded Best New Music; he stated that by "manifesting every glimmer of hope as a heaven-sent beacon and every letdown as a plunge towards the void," the band captured the essence of "adjacent masterpieces like [Neutral Milk Hotel's] In the Aeroplane Over the Sea, [Titus Andronicus's] The Monitor, and [Car Seat Headrest's] Teens of Denial" en route to Ants' "beautifully doomed fantasies." AllMusic's Timothy Monger gave the album four stars out of five, describing the album as "an impressive one, rife with forward momentum but preempted by its own self-mythology" regarding Wood.

Special praise was reserved for Wood's songwriting, widely lauded as an album highlight for its emotional intensity and depth. Jamie Kilkenny of Clash noted that "[t]he angle of [Ants'] lyrical riches grows ever more sentimental and singular" over repeated listens, and that "only Wood could wring so much profundity from a pleading wail to "show me the place where he inserted the blade"; or the beauty wrapped in the seemingly mundane "particles of bread" on the marvel of 'Bread Song.'" The Line of Best Fit's Kyle Kohner gave the album a perfect score, praising Wood as a "clairvoyant" author of "witty, abstract storytelling" on Ants and remarking upon his position as "the wry mouthpiece of a band... keenly speaking to a generation of young people." Tom Morgan of PopMatters applauded the band's "bold and progressive" compositions, but particularly distinguished Wood's lyrics as "unique and often profound," hailing his "deft, resonant words" for their "contemporary relevance" in contrast to those of his indie coevals.

Critics also singled out closing track 'Basketball Shoes' for praise, hailing the song's "astonishing" scope and "devastating, yet cleansing" emotional impact. Sam Richards of Uncut compared the song favorably to "Marquee Moon" and the work of Godspeed You! Black Emperor, praising it as "a moment of euphoria, catharsis or collapse" and declaring it "a gut-wrenching epic of Dostoevskian proportions."

The album was named a "Critic's Pick" by The New York Times.

Year-end lists

Track listing

Personnel
Adapted from vinyl liner notes and Uncut.

Black Country, New Road
 Charlie Wayne – drums, backing vocals
 Georgia Ellery – violin, mandolin, cello, backing vocals
 Isaac Wood – vocals, guitar
 Lewis Evans – saxophone, flute, backing vocals
 Luke Mark – guitar, backing vocals
 May Kershaw – keyboards, marimba, glockenspiel, backing vocals
 Tyler Hyde – bass, backing vocals

Additional personnel
 Tony Fagg – banjo (track 2)
 Mark Paton – vocals (track 7)
 Basil Tierney – additional drums (track 10)
 Christian Wright – mastering
 Sergio Maschetzko – engineering, mixing
 David Granshaw – engineering, mixing
 Tomas Moreno – additional engineering
 Simon Monk – art
 Joseph Durnan – layout

Charts

References

2022 albums
Black Country, New Road albums
Ninja Tune albums
Post-rock albums by British artists